Khairahani Secondary School is a secondary school located in Khairahani, Chitwan District in Nepal.

Address

Ghanshyam Pardhan, Khairahani Higher Secondary School, Khairahani-7, Jamauli, Khairahani, Chitwan, Nepal.

History
The school history began with its first registration as the (primary) school in Majhui Village of the Khairahani VDC, where it was established in B.S.2012 (1955 CE) through the efforts of late educationist Kishor Chandra Dhungana and the villagers of Majhui Village.  After some six months, as a result of the initiatives of Sultana resident Budhai (Boliya) Mahato, Bajralal Chaudhary and other villagers, the primary school was moved to Sultana, 2 miles from Mujhai. The first teacher of the school was Ramnath Pande.

In B.S.2013, the school was relocated to Khairahini. The land currently occupied by the school was the place of the Dharma Godam which was in bad condition. By B.S.2014, the building of Dharma Godam and 1 bigha 15 Kattha of land was transferred to the school through an auction and the school was shifted from Khairahini to where it now remains.

In B.S.2019 through the Shailendra Kumar Aayog, the school received 13 Bigaha of land but the land survey in B.S.2026 verified only 11 Bigaha and 7 Kattha land to be belonging to the school. Through some legal procedures, under the involvement of the Rameshwor Pande, Purendra Kumar Mainali, and other aware parents of the region in B.S.2024, the school began conducting high school level education with government approval.

The first principal of the school after this transformation was Purendra Kumar Mainali. Named Shree Khairahani Primary School on B.S.2012, the school was renamed as Mahendra Biddhashram on B.S.2020, and as Prithivi High School on B.S.2024 immediately after which it was once again named as Shree Khairahani High School. In this way, the school finally came to be known as Shree Khairahani High School, Khairahani.

The school serves Padampur, Kumroj, Kathar, Piple, Bhandara, Birendranagar, Chaninpur, Bachyauli and other eastern parts of the Chitwan District. Magani primary school was established in 2014.

Geographical position
The school is located in Khairahani of Khairahani Village Development Committee (VDC), Ward no. 7 of Chitwan district in the Narayani zone of Nepal.  Situated at around 1 km south from the east–west Mahendra Highway, the school premises are 18 km from District headquarters, Bharatpur.  From this institution, Birendranagar VDC is to the east, Ratnanagar Municipality to the west, Chainpur VDC to the North and Kumroj, Kathar and Bachhauli VDCs to the South.

In relation to the registered map, up to Bairahani 1 in the east, Ward 32 of Ratnanagar municipality in the west, Khairahani Ward 4, Chainpur in the north and Khairahani Ward 9, Buddhyauli and Fasera, roughly marks the boundary of the place including all of Khairahani VDC and parts of Ratnanagar where the school exercises its work space.

Scholarships

Lions Club Pagoda City Scholarships
Lions Club Pagoda City, Lalitpur provide scholarships instructing that they should be given to poor, needy and laborious students. So on the annual day of the school every year, these scholarships are distributed to such students.

Rapti Green Society Scholarship
The Rapti Green Society provides scholarships to help the poor, separated, discriminated and needy. The society provides these scholarships under these conditions:
  It provides all the material needed to study for the chosen poor and needy kids given that they regularly attend the school and have a good record.
  Primary students of discriminated background with extraordinary marks are provided with prizes and awards to boost their confidence.
  Those discriminated and poor kids that regularly take part in extracurricular activities are provided with encouraging prizes and awards.
 The society has made provisions for the primary level students of backwards, poor, dominated, discriminated or needy families only.

Jasodadevi Niraula Memorial Scholarship
When the wife of social server Bhawani Shankar Niraula, Mrs. Jasodadevi Niraula, died in April 2006, a scholarship was set up in her memory which provides the first and second students from classes 5,6,7 and 8 with a set of books and stationary each.

Junu Smriti Scholarship
Junu Pun, a child from the school who was preparing for SLC, was involved in an accident on 22 March 2004 and died. Her parents set up a scholarship fund in her name with a capital of Rs. 50,000 and made provisions so that from the interest of this fund annually two girls from the school with extraordinary marks receive this scholarship.

Extra-curricular activities

Sports
The school has sport grounds, equipment and game teachers. It has produced national players, who play in the national team.

Educational trips
The school organizes a recreation tour every year to enhance student knowledge with socialization process by focusing on an area, culture, place or people.

Cultural programs
The school organizes programs from dance competition to poem competition, cultural show to music show.

SCOUT
The school has a Scout unit. It arranges camping and fund rising events.

Red Cross
This promote awareness of health issues, natural disasters and first aid. It organizes blood donations, free eye tests and medical checkups every year for the poor communities across Khairahani VDC.

References

External links
 School website

Schools in Nepal
1955 establishments in Nepal